Zadock Thompson (1796–1856), was a Vermont naturalist, professor, and Episcopal priest.

Biography
Zadock Thompson was born in Bridgewater, Vermont on May 23, 1796. He graduated from the University of Vermont in 1823.

Thompson published numerous books on Vermont's history, the most notable being the History of the State of Vermont (1833) and History of the State of Vermont, Natural, Civil and Statistical (1842).

Thompson married Phebe Boyce and had three children: George Boyce Thompson, Harriet Towner Thompson, and Adeline Perry Thompson. Only his daughter, Adeline, survived childhood; she had four children before her death, at 30.

Zadock Thompson died in Burlington, Vermont on January 19, 1856.

References

1796 births
1857 deaths
American naturalists
19th-century American historians
19th-century American male writers
Historians of the United States
American Episcopal priests
People from Windsor County, Vermont
19th-century American Episcopalians
Historians from Vermont
19th-century American clergy
American male non-fiction writers